David Vandenbroeck (born 12 July 1985 in Braine-l'Alleud) is a Belgian football defender who is currently playing for FC Wiltz 71 in the Luxembourg National Division.

References

External links

Guardian football

1985 births
Living people
People from Braine-l'Alleud
Association football defenders
Belgian footballers
A.F.C. Tubize players
R. Charleroi S.C. players
K.V. Kortrijk players
S.V. Zulte Waregem players
Royal Antwerp F.C. players
Oud-Heverlee Leuven players
FC Differdange 03 players
FC Wiltz 71 players
Challenger Pro League players
Belgian Pro League players
Belgian expatriate footballers
Expatriate footballers in Luxembourg
Belgian expatriate sportspeople in Luxembourg
Footballers from Walloon Brabant